Paracles fusca is a moth of the subfamily Arctiinae first described by Francis Walker in 1856. It is found in Brazil and Argentina.

References

Moths described in 1856
Paracles